Claude Lanzmann (27 November 1925 – 5 July 2018) was a French filmmaker known for the Holocaust documentary film Shoah (1985).

Early life
Lanzmann was born on 27 November 1925 in Paris, France, the son of Paulette and Armand Lanzmann. His family was Jewish, and had immigrated to France from Eastern Europe. He was the brother of writer Jacques Lanzmann. While his family disguised their identity and went into hiding during World War II, he joined the French resistance at the age of 17, along with his father and brother, and fought in Auvergne. Lanzmann opposed the French war in Algeria and signed the 1960 antiwar petition Manifesto of the 121.

Career 
Lanzmann was the chief editor of the journal Les Temps Modernes, founded by Jean-Paul Sartre and Simone de Beauvoir, and lecturer at the European Graduate School in Saas-Fee, Switzerland. In 2009 he published his memoirs under the title Le lièvre de Patagonie ("The Patagonian Hare").

Shoah

Lanzmann's most renowned work, Shoah (1985), is a nine-and-a-half-hour oral history of the Holocaust. Shoah is made without the use of any historical footage, and uses only first-person testimony from perpetrators and victims, and contemporary footage of Holocaust-related sites. Interviewees include the Polish resistance fighter Jan Karski and the American Holocaust historian Raul Hilberg. When the film was released, the director also published the complete text, including in English translation, with introductions by Lanzmann and Simone de Beauvoir.

Lanzmann disagreed, sometimes angrily, with attempts to understand the why of Hitler, stating that the evil of Hitler cannot or should not be explained and that to do so is immoral and an obscenity.

On 4 July 2018, his last work, Les Quatre Soeurs (Shoah: Four Sisters) was released, featuring testimonials from four Holocaust survivors not included in his Shoah. Lanzmann died the following day.

Personal life
From 1952 to 1959, he lived with Simone de Beauvoir. In 1963 he married French actress Judith Magre. They divorced in 1971, and he later married Angelika Schrobsdorff, a German-Jewish writer. He divorced a second time, and was the father of Angélique Lanzmann and Félix Lanzmann. Claude Lanzmann died on 5 July 2018 at his Paris home, after having been ill for several days. He was 92.

Honours
Resistance Medal with rosette
Grand Cross of the National Order of Merit
2010 Welt-Literaturpreis
2011 Honorary Doctorate from the University of Lucerne
2011 Grand Officer of the Legion of Honor
At the 63rd Berlin International Film Festival in February 2013, Lanzmann was awarded with the Honorary Golden Bear.

Selected works
Filmography
Pourquoi Israël (1973)
Shoah (1985)
Tsahal (1994)
 (1997)
Sobibor, October 14, 1943, 4 p.m. (2001)
Lights and Shadows (2008)
The Karski Report (2010)
The Last of the Unjust (2013) about Benjamin Murmelstein, Elder of Theresienstadt
Napalm (2017)
Shoah: Four Sisters (2017)

As subject
Claude Lanzmann: Spectres of the Shoah (2015) a documentary about Lanzmann, directed by Adam Benzine

Books
Shoah: An Oral History of the Holocaust : The Complete Text of the Film. Pantheon Books, New York 1985, 
The Patagonian Hare: A Memoir (translated by Frank Wynne). London: Atlantic Books, 2012,  ; Farrar, Straus and Giroux, New York 2012, 
La Tombe du divin plongeur. Gallimard, Paris 2012

References

Further reading

Jeffries, Stuart. 'Claude Lanzmann on why Holocaust documentary Shoah still matters', The Guardian, 9 June 2011.
Lanzmann, Claude. "From the Holocaust to the Holocaust", Telos, 42, 21 December 1979, 137–143 
'Witness to History: Claude Lanzmann’s Journey to Shoah, Weekly Standard, 8 October 2012.
"Claude Lanzmann Shoah Collection", Steven Spielberg Film and Video Archive, United States Holocaust Memorial Museum (video excerpts and transcripts of all interviews for Shoah, including outtakes).
Galster, Ingrid (2011). "'Eine große Qualität meines Buches ist seine Ehrlichkeit.' Postscriptum zu der Debatte um die Autobiographie Claude Lanzmanns", in Das Argument, 290, 72–83.

1925 births
2018 deaths
20th-century French journalists
21st-century French journalists
Academic staff of European Graduate School
French film directors
French memoirists
French people of Belarusian-Jewish descent
French Resistance members
Grand Cross of the Ordre national du Mérite
Grand Officiers of the Légion d'honneur
César Honorary Award recipients
Honorary Golden Bear recipients
Jews in the French resistance
Lycée Condorcet alumni
Members of the Academy of Arts, Berlin
People from Bois-Colombes